Eugène Bozza was a French composer. The following is a list of compositions by Bozza.

Orchestral

Ballet 
 Fêtes romaines (1939)
 Jeux de plage (1945); in 1 act

Orchestra 
 Scherzo (1943)
 Variation libres et finale (1943)
 Rapsodie niçoise (1944)
 Pax triumphans, Symphonic Poem, Op. 63 (1945)
 Sinfonietta for string orchestra, Op. 61 (1946)
 Prélude et passacaille (1947)
 Symphonie (1948)
 Children's Overture (1964)
 Symphonie mimée
 Mallorca
 Suite pour un vaudeville, musique de scene pour la Station de Champbaudet
 Danse de la terre
 Voyages, Suite for orchestra and piano
 Mikrophonie for 17 soloists
 Figures sonores for 9 instruments
 Hommage à Rossini
 Marche des moissonneurs
 Cinq mouvements for string orchestra (1970)
 Symphony No. 1
 Symphony No. 2
 Symphony No. 3
 Symphony No. 4
 Symphony No. 5

Concertante 
 Concertino for viola and orchestra (1932)
 Concerto for violin and orchestra (1936)
 Concerto for saxophone and orchestra (1937)
 Introduzione et toccata for piano and orchestra (1938)
 Concertino for alto saxophone and orchestra (1939)
 Prélude et invention for chamber orchestra with piano obligato, Op. 24 (1939)
 Ballade for tenor trombone and orchestra, Op. 62 (1944)
 Concertino for bassoon and chamber orchestra, Op. 49 (1946)
 Concerto for cello and orchestra, Op. 57 (1948)
 Concertino for trumpet and chamber orchestra (1949)
 Concerto for clarinet and chamber orchestra (1952)
 Concertino for piano and winds (1955)
 Concerto for violin, viola, cello, winds, harp and double bass (1955)
 Concertino da camera for flute and string orchestra (or piano) (1964)
 Sicilienne et rondo for piano and orchestra (1965)
 Concertino for tuba (or bass saxhorn) and orchestra (1967)
 Atmosphères for 4 flutes and chamber orchestra (1978)
 Rapsodie niçoise for violin and orchestra
 Divertissement for violin solo, winds, celesta and harp (1989)

Wind band 
 Fanfare héroïque for 3 trumpets, 4 horns, 3 trombones, tuba, timpani, drums and cymbals, Op. 46 (1944)
 Ouverture pour une cérémonie for brass and percussion (1963)
 Ouverture rythmique (1963)
 Messe solennelle de Sainte Cécile for brass, timpani, organ and harp (ad libitum) (1968)
 Marche solennelle des X. jeux olympiques d'hiver
 ...des enfants de Valenciennes
 Pax triumphans (transcription for band)

Vocal

Opera 
 Léonidas (1947, revised 1974); in 3 acts, 4 scenes; libretto by Guy de Téramond
 Beppo: ou Le mort dont personne ne voulait (1963); opera buffa in 1 act; libretto by José Bruyr
 La duchesse de Langeais (1967); in 4 acts; libretto by Félix Forte after the novel by Honoré de Balzac

Oratorio 
 Tentation de Saint Antoine (1948)
 Passion de Jesus (1963)
 Le chant de la mine

Cantata 
 La légende de Roukmāni (1934)
 Psaumes for chorus, orchestra and organ (1938)
 Cantate du centenaire

Choral 
 L'étoile du soir, Chorus for 3 female voices and piano (1946)
 Requiem for soprano, tenor and baritone (1950)
 Messe de sa Sainte té Pie XII for soprano, alto, tenor, and baritone (1955)
 Messe de requiem for chorus and orchestra (1971)
 Messe à trois voix a capella
 Hymne for soprano, mezzo-soprano, tenor, baritone and piano or orchestra
 Sur le chemin du moulin for 4 voices and piano

Voice and piano 
 5 Chansons Niçoises for voice and piano, Op. 43 (1942)
 5 Chansons florentines for high voice and piano (1946)
 Colloque séntimental
 Vocalise for voice and piano

Piano
 Pulcinella, Op. 53 (1946)
 Toccata (1956)
 Deux pièces faciles (1962)
 Sonate for 2 pianos (1963)
 Allegro de concert (1974)
 Esquisse (1979)
 Promenade dans le parc (1979)

Chamber music

Violin 
 Nocturne sur le lac du Bourget for violin and piano, Op. 34 (1923)
 10 Pièces faciles à la première position for violin and piano (1935)
 Habañera for violin (or cello) and piano (1935)
 Sérénade espagnole for violin (or cello) and piano (1935)
 Aria for alto saxophone (or flute, or clarinet, or violin, or cello) and piano (1936)

Viola 
 Parthie for viola solo (1967)
 Improvisation burlesque for viola and piano (1968)

Cello 
 Habañera for violin (or cello) and piano (1935)
 Sérénade espagnole for violin (or cello) and piano (1935)
 Aria for alto saxophone (or flute, or clarinet, or violin, or cello) and piano (1936)
 Orphéus for cello solo (published 1993)

Double bass 
 Allegro et finale for double bass (or tuba, or bass saxhorn, or bass trombone) and piano (1953)
 Prélude et allegro for double bass (or tuba, or bass saxhorn, or bass trombone) and piano (1953)
 Pièce sur le nom d'Édouard Nanny for double bass and piano (1956)
 8 Études for double bass (1976)

Harp 
 Improvisation sur le nom de Marcel Tournier (1979)
 Rondino et menuet (1991)

Guitar 
 Concertino for guitar and string quartet (1969)
 Deux impressions Andalouses for guitar (1969)
 Trois préludes for guitar (1970)

Flute 
 Aria for alto saxophone (or flute, or clarinet, or violin, or cello) and piano (1936)
 Fantaisie italienne for clarinet (or flute, or oboe) and piano (1939)
 Image for flute solo, Op. 38 (1939)
 Agrestide for flute and piano, Op. 44 (1942)
 Soir dans les montagnes for flute and piano (1946)
 Trois cadences pour le concerto en sol pour flûte de Mozart (1949)
 Air pastoral for flute (or oboe) and piano (1953)
 Jour d'été à la montagne for flute quartet (1953)
 Ronde for flute quartet (1953)
 Trois impressions for flute and piano (1953)
 14 Études-arabesques for flute (1960)
 Deux impressions for flute and harp (1967)
 Deux esquisses for flute quartet (1972)
 Dialogue for flute and piano (1972)
 10 Études sur des modes karnatiques (10 Studies in Karnatic Modes) for flute (1972)
 Air de vielle for flute (or oboe) and piano (1976)
 Berceuse for flute (or oboe) and piano (1976)
 Quatre pièces faciles for flute and piano (1976)
 Cinq chansons sur des thèmes japonais for flute and piano (1978)
 Interlude for recorder (soprano / alto) solo, or flute solo (1978)
 Phorbéia for flute solo (1978)
 Trois pièces for flute quartet (1979)
 3 Évocations for 2 flutes (1988)
 Le chant de forêts
 Aux bonds du torrent
 Pastorale

Recorder 
 Interlude for recorder (soprano / alto) solo, or flute solo (1978)

Oboe / English horn 
 Divertissement for English horn (or alto saxophone) and piano, Op. 39 (1939)
 Fantaisie italienne for clarinet (or flute, or oboe) and piano (1939)
 Fantaisie pastorale for oboe and piano, Op. 37 (1939)
 18 Études for oboe (1950)
 Air pastoral for oboe (or flute) and piano (1953)
 Conte pastorale for oboe and piano (1953)
 Lied for English horn and piano (1954)
 Sonate for oboe and piano (1971)
 Suite monodique for oboe solo (1971)
 14 Études sur des modes karnatiques (14 Studies in Karnatic Modes) for oboe solo (1972)
 Air de vielle for oboe (or flute) and piano (1976)
 Berceuse for oboe (or flute) and piano (1976)
 Pastorale for oboe and piano (1979)

Clarinet / bass clarinet 
 Aria for alto saxophone (or flute, or clarinet, or violin, or cello) and piano (1936)
 Ballade for bass clarinet and piano (1939)
 Fantaisie italienne for clarinet (or flute, or oboe) and piano (1939)
 Pulcinella for clarinet (or alto saxophone) and piano (1944)
 14 Études de mecanisme for clarinet (1948)
 Bucolique for clarinet and piano (1949)
 Claribel for clarinet and piano (1952)
 12 Études for clarinet (1953)
 Idylle for clarinet and piano (1959)
 Prélude et divertissement for clarinet (or alto saxophone) and piano (1960)
 Caprice-improvisation for clarinet and piano (1963)
 Lucioles for 6 clarinets (1963)
 Divertissement for clarinet and piano, Op. 39 (1964)
 Épithalame for clarinet and piano (1971)
 Sonatine for clarinet quartet (1971); also for flute, oboe, clarinet and bassoon
 11 Études sur des modes karnatiques (11 Studies in Karnatic Modes) for clarinet (1972)
 Suite for clarinet and piano (1973)
 Rapsodie niçoise for clarinet and piano (1977)

Bassoon 
 Récit, sicilienne et rondo for bassoon and piano (1936)
 Fantaisie for bassoon and piano (1945)
 15 Études journalières for bassoon (1945)
 Divertissement for 3 bassoons (1954)
 Duettino for 2 bassoons (1954)
 Burlesque for bassoon and piano (1957)
 Espièglerie for bassoon and piano (1960)
 Prélude et divertissement for bassoon and piano (1960)
 Nocturne-danse for bassoon (or alto saxophone) and piano (1967)
 12 Caprices for bassoon solo (1968)
 Pièces brèves for bassoon solo (1968)
 11 Études sur des modes karnatiques (11 Studies in Karnatic Modes) for bassoon (1972)
 Shiva for bassoon and piano (1974)
 Cadenza for bassoon and piano

Saxophone 
 Aria for alto saxophone (or flute, or clarinet, or violin, or cello) and piano (1936)
 Andante et Scherzo for saxophone quartet (1938)
 Divertissement for alto saxophone (or English horn) and piano, Op. 39 (1939)
 Pulcinella for alto saxophone (or clarinet) and piano, Op. 53 No. 1 (1944)
 Scaramouche for alto saxophone and piano, Op. 53 No. 2 (1944)
 12 Études-caprices for saxophone, Op. 60 (1944)
 Nuages, Scherzo for saxophone quartet (1946)
 Improvisation et caprice for saxophone solo (1952)
 Impromptu et danse for alto saxophone (or baritone saxophone) and piano (1954)
 Pièce brève for alto saxophone solo (1955)
 Prélude et divertissement for alto saxophone (or clarinet) and piano (1960)
 Chanson à bercer for alto saxophone and piano (1964)
 Gavotte des demoiselles for alto saxophone and piano (1964)
 La campanile for alto saxophone and piano (1964)
 Menuet des pages for alto saxophone and piano (1964)
 Parade des petits soldats for alto saxophone and piano (1964)
 Petite gavotte for alto saxophone and piano (1964)
 Rêves d'enfant for alto saxophone and piano (1964)
 Nocturne-danse for alto saxophone (or bassoon) and piano (1967)
 Tarentelle for alto saxophone and piano (1968)
 Diptyque for alto saxophone and piano (1970)
 Pièce concertante for tenor saxophone and piano

Horn 
 En forêt for horn and piano (or orchestra), Op. 40 (1941)
 En Irlande for horn and piano (1951)
 Suite for horn quartet (1952)
 Chant lointain for horn and piano (1957)
 Sur les cimes for horn and piano (1960)
 18 Études en forme d'improvisation for horn (1961)
 Entretiens for horn and piano (1974)

Trumpet / cornet 
 Caprice No. 1 for trumpet and piano, Op. 47 (1943)
 Badinage for trumpet and piano (1950)
 16 Études for trumpet, bugle, or cornet (1950)
 Dialogue for 2 trumpets (1954)
 Rustiques for cornet or trumpet and piano (1955)
 Rapsodie for trumpet and piano (1957)
 Cornettina for cornet or trumpet and piano (1965)
 Frigariana for trumpet and piano (1967)
 11 Études sur des modes karnatiques (11 Studies in Karnatic Modes) for trumpet (1972)
 Lied for trumpet and piano (1976)
 Caprice No. 2 for trumpet and piano (1978)

Trombone 
 Ballade for trombone and piano (1944)
 Allegro et finale for bass trombone (or double bass, or tuba, or bass saxhorn) and piano (1953)
 Prélude et allegro for bass trombone (or double bass, or tuba, or bass saxhorn) and piano (1953)
 13 Études-caprices for trombone (1956)
 Hommage à Bach for trombone and piano (1957)
 Thème varié for bass trombone (or tuba, or bass saxhorn) and piano (1957)
 New Orleans for bass trombone (or tuba, or bass saxhorn) and piano (1962)
 3 Pièces for trombone quartet (tuba ad libitum) (1964)
 Ciaccona for trombone and piano (1967)
 11 Études sur des modes karnatiques (11 Studies in Karnatic Modes) for trombone (1972)

Bass saxhorn 
 Allegro et finale for bass saxhorn (or double bass, or tuba, or bass trombone) and piano (1953)
 Prélude et allegro for bass saxhorn (or double bass, or tuba, or bass trombone) and piano (1953)
 Thème varié for bass saxhorn (or tuba, or bass trombone) and piano (1957)
 New Orleans for bass saxhorn (or tuba, or bass trombone) and piano (1962)

Tuba 
 Allegro et finale for tuba (or double bass, or bass saxhorn, or bass trombone) and piano (1953)
 Prélude et allegro for tuba (or double bass, or bass saxhorn, or bass trombone) and piano (1953)
 Thème varié for tuba (or bass saxhorn, or bass trombone) and piano (1957)
 New Orleans for tuba (or bass saxhorn, or bass trombone) and piano (1962)

Percussion 
 Rythmic for timpani, percussion and piano, Op. 70 (1948)
 Rhapsodie sur des airs japonais for timpani, xylophone, vibraphone, percussion and piano (1978)
 Vanaspati for 12 percussionists and xylophone ad libitum (1979)
 Rag Music for timpani, glockenspiel, xylophone, marimba, vibraphone, percussion and piano (1981)
 Trois esquisses japonaises for percussion

Duos 
 Sonatine for flute and bassoon (1938)
 Ricercare for violin and cello (1959)
 Polydiaphonie for flute and guitar (1972)
 Quatre esquisses for trumpet and trombone (1974)
 Trois mouvements for flute and clarinet (1974)
 Berceuse et sérénade for flute and guitar (1976)
 Sonatine for viola and cello (1976)
 Contrastes I for flute and bassoon (1977)
 Contrastes II for oboe and bassoon (1977)
 Contrastes III for clarinet and bassoon (1977)
 Contrastes IV for trumpet and horn (1977)
 Trois essais for trombone and percussion (1977)
 Trois pièces for flute and guitar (1977)
 Trois pièces for flute and oboe (or flute) (published 1990)

Trios 
 Fughette, sicilienne, rigaudon for oboe, clarinet and bassoon (1934)
 Suite brève en trio for oboe, clarinet and bassoon (1947)
 Sérénade en trio for flute, clarinet and bassoon (1971)

Quartets 
 Quatuor en la for string quartet (1946)
 3 Pièces pour une musique de nuit for flute, oboe, clarinet and bassoon (1954)
 Trois pièces for 4 trombones (bass trombone or tuba ad libitum) (1964)
 Sérénade pour quatuor à vent for flute, oboe, clarinet and bassoon (1969)
 Sonatine pour quatuor à vent for flute, oboe, clarinet and bassoon (1971)
 Trois pièces pour quatuor de cuivres for 2 trumpets, horn and trombone (1977)

Quintets 
 Variations sur un thème libre for woodwind quintet, Op. 42 (1943) 
 Scherzo for woodwind quintet, Op. 48 (1944)
 Sonatine for brass quintet (1951)
 Bis for brass quintet (1963)
 Giration for brass quintet (1967)
 Suite française for brass quintet (1967)
 Suite [No. 2] for brass quintet (1967)
 Pentaphonie for woodwind quintet (1969)
 Trilogie for brass quintet (1969)
 Trois mouvements for 2 trumpets (or cornets), horn, trombone and tuba (1979)
 Quand les muses collaborent for woodwind quintet

Larger ensembles 
 Symphonie da camera for 2 oboes, 2 clarinets, 2 bassoons and 2 horns (1960)
 Quatre mouvements pour septuor à vent for flute, oboe, clarinet, bassoon, horn, trumpet and trombone (1970)
 Octanphonie for 2 oboes, 2 clarinets, 2 horns and 2 bassoons (1972)
 Prélude et chaconne for 3 trumpets, 4 horns, 3 trombones, tuba, timpani, bass drum and gong (1976)
 Trois pièces pour septuor de cuivres for 2 trumpets, horn, 3 trombones and tuba (1985)
 Cappricio sur le nom de Claude Delvincourt for 12 wind instruments
 Symphonie de chambre for flute, oboe, clarinet, bassoon, horn, harp, celesta and piano

Bozza, Eugene, compositions by